Joseph Seigenthaler (born 1959) is an American sculptor and video artist who was born in Nashville, Tennessee.  He earned a BFA in painting from the Memphis College of Art in 1981.  Shortly after graduating, he freelanced sculpting life-sized wax figures for wax museums, primarily the Music Valley Wax Museum in Nashville and the Country Music Wax Museum in Tamworth, Australia.  He studied ceramic art at the Appalachian Center for Craft in Smithville, Tennessee between 1984 and 1986.  In 1990, he received an MFA from Northern Illinois University.

Seigenthaler has taught ceramic art at the University of Montana – Missoula, Harold Washington College in Chicago, and the School of the Art Institute of Chicago.  He is married to the painter Anne Gilbert and currently lives and works in Chicago.

He is best known for his bizarre and/or imbecilic figurative clay sculptures, although he has more recently been creating computer animation loops of his creatures.  The Honolulu Museum of Art, Museo de Escultura Figurativa Internacional Contemporánea (Murcia, Spain), the Museum of Contemporary Art, Chicago, and the Racine Art Museum (Racine, Wisconsin) are among the public institutions holding work by Joseph Seigenthaler.

Footnotes

References
 Dunbier, Lonnie Pierson (Editor), The Artists Bluebook,  Scottsdale, Ariz., AskART.com Inc., 2005

External links
 The artist’s webpage
 Joseph Seigenthaler on AskArt.com
 

20th-century American sculptors
American video artists
Living people
1959 births
People from Nashville, Tennessee
21st-century American sculptors